The 15h Annual Petit Le Mans was an endurance auto race held at the Road Atlanta circuit in Braselton, Georgia on October 20, 2012.  The race served as the final round of both the American Le Mans Series and European Le Mans Series seasons.

Nicolas Prost, Neel Jani, and Andrea Belicchi of Rebellion Racing won the event by a three lap margin after qualifying on pole position in only the team's second attempt at the race.  Level 5 Motorsports's two cars finished in second and third overall and lead the P2 category, while TDS Racing led home the European Le Mans Series contingent with fourth place overall.  CORE Autosport won the PC category by two laps over RSR Racing.  In GT Extreme Speed Motorsports led the class for Ferrari over Corvette Racing, while IMSA Performance Matmut was the sole survivor in the GTE Am category.  NGT Motorsport dominated the GTC class with five laps over TRG who held second and third place.

Race

Result

Class winners in bold.  Cars failing to complete 70% of their class winner's distance are marked as Not Classified (NC).

  – The #37 Conquest Morgan-Nissan was disqualified for exceeding the maximum number of hours a single driver could be in the car.

References

Petit Le Mans
Petit Le Mans
Petit Le Mans
Petit Le Mans